Duddleswell is a sheep's cheese made in England.

It was created in 1988 at the High Weald Dairy in Horsted Keynes, West Sussex. It contains sheep milk and vegetable rennet. Once made, it is matured for five months. It contains 35% Fat, 24% Protein, 3% carbohydrate, 2% Fibre, and 1.65% Salt.

It received Gold at the International Cheese Awards in 2010 and 2011, and Bronze at the British Cheese Awards in 2010.

References

English cheeses
Sheep's-milk cheeses
West Sussex